Berlin-Tokyo/Tokyo-Berlin. The Art of Two Cities was presented by the Neue Nationalgalerie, New National Gallery in Berlin, Germany 7 June - 3 October 2006

On the occasion of the Germany Year in Japan 2005/2006, the Mori Art Museum Tokyo and the Neue Nationalgalerie (New National Gallery) Berlin supported by the Berlin Art Library, the Kupferstichkabinett Berlin (Museum of Prints and Drawings) and the Museum für Ostasiatische Kunst (Museum of East Asian Art), organized a comprehensive art show with the title "Berlin-Tokyo/Tokyo-Berlin. Die Kunst zweier Städte".

Artists

Subjects

For the architectural design of the Upper Hall, the Nationalgalerie commissioned the Japanese architect Toyo Ito. In collaboration with architects Florian Busch and Christoph Cellarius, Ito transformed Mies van der Rohe’s glass shrine into an exciting space, a completely new experience in which art and architecture have melt in an unusual fusion. 
Following Mies' rigorous Cartesian logic, the three architects' project transformed the strictly homogeneous exhibition hall into a continuous yet subtly differentiated space where the thirteen artists exhibiting on the upper hall started interesting dialogues and so heightened the intensity of the exhibition's theme.

References

"Berlin - Tokyo / Tokyo - Berlin Die Kunst zweier Städte", Berlin, 2006. editors: Angela Schneider, Gabriele Knapstein, David Elliott u. a. 350 pages in German language, publisher: Hatje Cantz Verlag,

External links 
Neue Nationalgalerie, Berlin-Tokyo/Tokyo-Berlin. Die Kunst zweier Städte

Art exhibitions in Germany